Night Without Stars is a 1951 British black-and-white dramatic thriller film, starring David Farrar, Nadia Gray and Maurice Teynac. The screenplay was written by Winston Graham based upon his eponymous 1950 novel. The film was directed by Anthony Pelissier and produced by Hugh Stewart.

It was shot at Pinewood Studios with sets designed by the art director Alex Vetchinsky.

Plot
The film begins in the spring of 1947 on the south coast of France on the French Riviera.

English lawyer Giles Gordon (David Farrar) has been partially blinded during service in World War II, and fears his eyesight is worsening.

After he stumbles in a shoe shop, the shop assistant Alix Delaisse (Nadia Gray) recognises him later in the day and joins him at a cafe. She explains she is the widow of a French Resistance fighter hanged in Nice. Restaurateur Pierre Chava (Gérard Landry) approaches Giles and warns him off with the claim that Alix is already promised to him. He tells Giles that Alix is involved with black marketers, blackmailers and murderers from the war years and demands that Giles forget her and return to England.

Giles and Alix spend more and more time together. After a day of water sports in Monaco, he mistakenly enters a room of Alix's black market contacts. She tells him to go home to England.

Pierre also pressures him to leave. He goes to Pierre's flat and finds a dead body which, due to his poor eyesight, he presumes to be Pierre, but he is persuaded by a marketeer that it was not Pierre.

Giles goes back to England and goes to his doctor who says he can restore his sight. He has an operation and is shown a press cutting saying that Pierre has been killed in a car crash, but his body is unrecognisable.

Giles returns to France and wears dark glasses to disguise his restored sight. He tracks down Alix and reveals that he can now see. Armand invites him to dinner with Alix and explains the whole situation: Pierre had betrayed the Resistance group to the Nazis, bringing the death of Alix's husband, and they had sought revenge. Malinay (Alix's brother) had killed Pierre in his flat. He later returned to collect the body and stage an accidental death.

The marketeers decide Giles knows too much and try to stage another death, pushing him over a cliff in a car. They fail to see him fall out on the way down and presume he is killed when the car explodes at the bottom. Giles struggles to ascend the steep cliff back to the road. He returns to confront Malinay and declare his love for Alix.

Cast
 David Farrar as Giles Gordon
 Nadia Gray as Alix Delaisse née Malinay
 Maurice Teynac as Louis Malinay
 Gérard Landry as Pierre Chaval
 June Clyde as Claire
 Robert Ayres as Walter
 Clive Morton as Dr. Coulson
 Eugene Deckers as Armand
 Martin Benson as White Cap
 Gilles Quéant as Inspector Deffand
 Ina De La Haye as 'Mere Roget'
 Richard Molinas as Driver
 Jeanne Pali as Madame Colloni
 Marcel Poncin as Blind Man

Releases
The film was released theatrically in the United Kingdom on 4 April 1951, in Finland on 19 October 1951, in Sweden on 3 December 1951, in Portugal on 1 June 1952, in the United States on 5 July 1953 and in Denmark on 16 November 1953. It was released in Austria as Nacht ohne Sterne, in Denmark as Natten uden stjerner, in Finland as Tähdetön yö, in Greece as Nyhta horis asteria, in Italy as Notte senza stelle, in Portugal as Quando a Luz Voltou, in Sweden as Natt utan stjärnor, and in West Germany as Nacht ohne Sterne.

References

External links
 

1951 films
1950s crime thriller films
1951 drama films
1950s mystery films
1950s romance films
British black-and-white films
British crime thriller films
British drama films
British mystery films
Cold War films
Film noir
Films directed by Anthony Pelissier
Films based on British novels
Films based on mystery novels
Films based on romance novels
Films set in Nice
Films set in London
Films set in 1947
Films scored by William Alwyn
Films shot at Pinewood Studios
1950s English-language films
1950s British films